Hüseyin Suat Sungur (1931 – 21 August 2022) was a Turkish merchant and politician.

Sungur was born in 1931 in Bursa. He graduated from Art Institute. After graduating from the institute, he started his business life. He established Bursa Çimento in 1966 with his friends. He served as the chairman of the board of directors of Bursa Chamber of Commerce and Industry between 1969 and 1972. Also, he was a member of Justice Party. He served as 15th term Grand National Assembly of Turkey Bursa deputy. He ended his political career after 1980. He died on 21 August 2022.

References

External links 

 Interview with Hüseyin Sungur
 Interview with Hüseyin Sungur (2)

1931 births
2022 deaths
Members of the 15th Parliament of Turkey
People from Bursa
Turkish merchants
Turkish politicians